Maharaja Himmat Singhji (2 September 1899 – 24 November 1960) was the last ruler of the princely state of Idar State. He was Maharaja of Idar from 1931 to 1948.

Birth
He was the eldest son of Maharaja Daulat Singh was born on 2 September 1899 at Jodhpur. He was educated at Mayo College at Ajmer.

He attended the Coronation of the King George V and Queen Mary, at Westminster Abbey, in London and served as Page-of-Honour to the King-Emperor at the Delhi Coronation Durbar in 1911.

Ascension 
He succeeded on the death of his father on 14 April 1931 as Maharaja of Idar state and was installed on the gadi (throne) at Himmatnagar on 11 July 1931. Upon the independence of India, he merged his state in to the Union of India on 10 June 1948.

He also held the title of Colonel-in-Chief of Idar Sir Pratap Infantry from 1931 to 1954.

He was an outstanding all-round sportsman with varied interests of sports like -  hunting, horse-racing, polo, tent-pegging and pig-sticking, cricket and football.

Death
He died on 24 November 1960. He had two sons Maharaja Daljit Singh (who succeeded him as Maharaja of Idar) and Maharaj Shri Amar Singhji.

Memorials
The town of Himmatnagar, which served as Capital of Idar State, was renamed after him from Ahmadnagar by his father Maharaja Sir Daulat Singhji in year 1912,  who was then the heir-apparent to the throne of Idar.

Honors
 Delhi Durbar Medal - silver (1911)
 King George V Silver Jubilee Medal - 1935, 
 King George VI Coronation Medal - 1937 
 Indian Independence Medal - 1948, 
 Halvad-Dhrangadhra State Rajyabhisek Medal 1st class - 1942
 Halvad-Dhrangadhra Accession to India Medal -25 March 1948

References

1899 births
1960 deaths
Maharajas of Idar
Indian royalty
Mayo College alumni